Lebadea is a genus of butterflies found in Southeast Asia ranging from India to the Sunda Islands

Species
Lebadea alankara (Horsfield, [1829])
Lebadea ismene (Doubleday, [1848])
Lebadea martha (Fabricius, 1787)

References

External links
Images representing Lebadea at EOL
Images representing Lebadea at Bold

Limenitidinae
Nymphalidae genera
Taxa named by Baron Cajetan von Felder